Maryland Route 494 (MD 494) is a state highway in the U.S. state of Maryland.  Known as Fairview Road, the state highway runs  from the Pennsylvania state line near Fairview, where the highway continues north as Pennsylvania Route 75 (PA 75), east to MD 63 in Cearfoss.  MD 494 was constructed in the 1930s.  The state highway originally ended at MD 57, but was extended to the state line in the early 1960s.

Route description

MD 494 begins at the Pennsylvania state line near Fairview. The highway continues north across the state line as PA 75 (Fort Loudon Road) toward Mercersburg. MD 494 heads southeast as a two-lane undivided highway toward an intersection with MD 57 (St. Paul Road). From there, the state highway heads east through farmland and scattered residences, passing through the hamlet of Fairview. MD 494 intersects Rockdale Road, which leads to the Joseph Fiery House, before crossing Conococheague Creek. MD 494 crosses Toms Run and passes Broadfording Church Road before reaching its eastern terminus at MD 63 (Greencastle Pike) in Cearfoss.

History
MD 494 was paved from the Pennsylvania state line east to Toms Run, including the bridge over Conococheague Creek, by 1933.  Another segment from Cearfoss to Broadfording Church Road was completed in 1935.  The gap was filled when construction was completed west of Cearfoss in 1939.  The segment of MD 494 from MD 57 to the state line was originally part of MD 57.  MD 57 was removed from the run to the state line in favor of MD 494 in 1963.

Junction list

See also

References

External links

MDRoads: MD 494

494
Maryland Route 494